The Hutchinson–Suddath Building is a historic building at 315-319 East Bay Street in Jacksonville, Florida, United States. On October 3, 2007, it was added to the U.S. National Register of Historic Places.

This property is part of the Downtown Jacksonville Multiple Property Submission, a Multiple Property Submission to the National Register.

History 
The Hutchison-Suddath Building was built in 1910 for the Hutchinson Shoe Company, which occupied the building until 1931, when it was bought by the Suddath Company. In 1936, the building also held the Cable Piano Company.

References

Office buildings in Jacksonville, Florida
Buildings and structures in Jacksonville, Florida
History of Jacksonville, Florida
National Register of Historic Places in Jacksonville, Florida